Shagoon is a 1964 Indian Hindi drama film directed by Nazar. The film stars Waheeda Rehman, Kamaljeet, Nazir Hussain, Achla Sachdev, Nivedita (Libi Rana), Pratima Devi, Chand Usmani and Nana Palsikar. The film was shot at Mehboob Studios in Bombay and Nainital.

The film had music by  Khayyam with lyrics Sahir Ludhianvi, creating memorable songs like "Parbaton Ke Pedon Par Shaam" sung by Mohammed Rafi and Suman Kalyanpur and "Tum Apna Ranj-o-gham" by Jagjit Kaur.

Plot
While on a trip to Nainital, Geeta (Waheeda Rehman) meets Madan (Kamaljit) and falls in love  with him. Madan is from Delhi and his father is a wealthy man. His mother played by Achla Sachdev is a  superstitious woman who constantly gets poojas performed by pandits. Madan expresses his desire to marry Geeta and his parents agree to his request. But the family pandit studies Geeta's horoscope and reveals that she is a manglik and hence inauspicious. Being a manglik or having Mangal Dosha is considered unfortunate as per Indian astrology.

Cast
 Waheeda Rehman as Geeta
 Kamaljit Singh as Madan
 Nazir Hussain as Rai Saheb
 Nana Palsikar as Girdharilal manager
 Achla Sachdev as Madan's mother
 Pratima Devi as Geeta's mother
 Chand Usmani as Mrs. Rai
 Durga Khote
 Libi Rana (Nivedita) as Rekha, Girdarilal's niece
 Master Pradeep as Gappu

Music

Music in the film is by  Khayyam with lyrics Sahir Ludhianvi.

 "Parbaton Ke Pedon Par Shaam Ka Basera Tha" - Mohammed Rafi and Suman Kalyanpur
 "Yeh Raat Bahut Rangeen Sahi" - Mohammed Rafi
 "Tum Chali Jaogi Parchhayiyan Reh Jayegi" - Mohammed Rafi
 "Bujha Diye Hain Khud Apne Haathon" - Suman Kalyanpur
 "Itane Qarib Aa Ke Bhi Na Jaane Kis Liye" - Mubarak Begum, Talat Mahmood
 "Zindagi Zulm Sahi Jabr Sahi Gam Hi Sahi" - Suman Kalyanpur
 "Tum Apna Ranj-o-gham" - Jagjit Kaur 
 "Gori Sasuraal Chali" - Jagjit Kaur

References

External links
 

1964 films
1960s Hindi-language films
1960s Urdu-language films
Indian drama films
Films shot in Uttarakhand
Films shot in Mumbai
Indian black-and-white films
Films set in Delhi
Films scored by Khayyam
1964 drama films
Hindi-language drama films
Urdu-language Indian films